Jalangi Mahavidyalaya, established in 2010, is a general degree college in Jalangi, Murshidabad district. It offers undergraduate and postgraduate courses in Arts. It is affiliated to the University of Kalyani.

Departments

Bachelors of Arts
Bengali
English
History
Geography(B.A)
Political Science
philosophy

See also

Education for West Bengal

References

External links
https://www.jalangimahavidyalaya.com/
University of Kalyani
University Grants Commission
National Assessment and Accreditation Council

Universities and colleges in Murshidabad district
Colleges affiliated to University of Kalyani
Educational institutions established in 2010
2010 establishments in West Bengal